The 2018–19 Aberdeen F.C. season was Aberdeen's 105th season in the top flight of Scottish football. Aberdeen also competed in the League Cup and the Scottish Cup.

Aberdeen also competed in qualifying for the 2018–19 UEFA Europa League.

Summary

May 

On 14 May, Scott McKenna & Graeme Shinnie were called up to the national team. On 28 May, Gothenburg Great Neale Cooper died at the age of 54. On 29 May, Graeme Shinnie made his full Scotland debut, coming on as a substitute in a 2–0 defeat to Peru.

June 

On 1 June, Lewis Ferguson officially joined the club, although the compensation fee still had to be sorted between the Dons and Hamilton Academical. On 2 June, Scott McKenna, in his fourth game for Scotland, was made team captain in a 1–0 defeat to Mexico. Graeme Shinnie also earned his first start for Scotland.

On 5 June, Chris Forrester joined the club from Peterborough United for a fee believed to be in the region of £150,000. On 12 June, the club announced that their Pre-season training camp would be taking place in Ireland and the club would play a friendly against Cobh Ramblers. On 14 June, defender Anthony O'Connor joined Bradford City on a three-year deal. After his release from Ipswich Town, Irish International Stephen Gleeson signed on a two-year deal.

On 15 June, the season league fixtures were announced by the SPFL, with the Dons starting at home to Rangers, with the game being live on TV on 5 August at 1pm. On the same day, the Dons announced a pre-season friendly at home to English Championship club West Bromwich Albion. On 20 June, the Europa League Second Qualifying Round draw was made and the Dons were drawn against English Premier League club Burnley. It was the first time the Dons played English opposition in Europe since Ipswich Town in 1981.

On 25 June, Executive Vice-Chairman George Yule announced that he would be leaving his role following major surgery, said to be "a prostate cancer scare" but he explained he was "heading towards full recovery". On 26 June, Scotland Under-21 International Daniel Harvie, who was released last season as he wanted regular football, signed for Ayr United.

July 

On 3 July, the start of the construction phase began on the New Aberdeen Stadium. On 8 July, after the 2–2 draw against St Johnstone, the Dons took the decision to cancel the friendly on 11 July with Inverness Caledonian Thistle due to "a number of fitness concerns within the first team squad".

On 11 July, goalkeeper Danny Rogers joined St Mirren on a season long loan deal. On the same day, former Hearts defender Krystian Nowak joined on trial. After being on loan last season, Dominic Ball rejoined the club again for a second season-long loan spell.

On 15 July, the friendly match between the Dons and Cove Rangers was abandoned after 50 minutes due to a severe head injury to Cove Rangers player Jordon Brown. After sustaining an injury in the match, the Dons announced defender Mark Reynolds was ruled out until the end of the year having to undergo knee surgery.

On 19 July, striker Adam Rooney left for newly promoted National League side Salford City for a reported fee of £375,000.  He scored 88 goals in 197 appearances for the club.  The transfer led to Accrington Stanley owner Andy Holt accusing Salford, and most notably Gary Neville, of "buying" a place in the English Football League, with Rooney reportedly due to earn £4,000 per week at Salford. Motherwell manager Stephen Robinson also accused Neville of "lacking etiquette" after discussing his club's transfer business and "blew them away with money" to get the deal done.

On 22 July, Austrian goalkeeper Sebastian Gessl joined on trial after leaving German side Karlsruher SC. On 25 July, the Dons signed both Goalkeeper Tomáš Černý, on a one-year deal after his release from Partick Thistle, and defender Tommie Hoban, on loan from Watford with the club having the option of recalling him in January 2019.

August 

On 2 August, the Dons were knocked out of UEFA Europa League at the Second qualifying round stage against Burnley. Even though with defeat, the Dons were praised by Burnley fans by creating a great atmosphere at both matches.

After his actions after the match last season against Celtic, defender Shay Logan was suspended for the first 3 matches of the league season beginning on 5 August, against Rangers, Dundee and St Mirren. On 8 August, defender Scott McKenna was ruled out for 6 weeks with an injury picked up in the 1–1 draw with Rangers. On 13 August, striker James Wilson joined from Manchester United on a season-long loan deal.

After the 4–0 win in the League Cup against St Mirren, the Dons were drawn against Hibernian in the Quarter Finals, although at the time of the draw, it was not known whether it was Hibernian or Ross County. On 20 August, compensation was agreed after a tribunal for midfielder Lewis Ferguson after signing him from Hamilton Academical with the fee being kept private and although the Dons felt they had "received a fair hearing", Hamilton wanted "The guidelines used in making the decision should be made available".

On 22 August, the Dons rejected a £3.5m bid from Celtic for defender Scott McKenna, with manager Derek McInnes stating that McKenna would not be sold in the transfer window, and that another bid would be a waste of time. Aberdeen valued the centre-half at around £10m.

On 30 August, Max Lowe joined on loan from Derby County, initially until January 2019. On 31 August, Jordan McGregor joined after being released from Airdrieonians and impressing on trial. He joined with the Development Squad.

September 

On Transfer deadline day, the Dons rejected a reported £7m bid from Aston Villa for defender Scott McKenna.

On 1 September, Mikey Devlin was sent off by referee Craig Thomson after only 5 minutes in a 2–0 home loss to Kilmarnock. The decision was appealed by the Dons but was rejected by the SFA with manager McInnes stating that he was "extremely disappointed with this outcome" and he later criticized the SFA for their "incompetency". On 4 September, Bruce Anderson signed a new deal until 2021.

After progressing through to the Semi-finals with a win against Hibernian (6–5 on penalties after a 0–0 draw after extra-time), the Dons were drawn to face Rangers. Alfredo Morelos and Kyle Lafferty were suspended for them. Oddly, the venue was not chosen until a later date due to clashes with Celtic and the Europa League, with Murrayfield Stadium being a likely option due to the demand for tickets. The following day, due to dismay expressed from the club and supporters, the match with Rangers was due to take place at noon at Hampden Park.

October 

On 3 October, the League Cup semi final match with Rangers was changed to a 4:30pm kick off time after fans and clubs appeals.

On 4 October, the SPFL suspended Scott McKenna for two matches after his challenge on Odsonne Édouard in the match against Celtic. The Dons appealed however it was rejected. On 11 October, defender Scott McKenna came on a second-half substitute in a 2–1 defeat against Israel, marking his competitive debut for Scotland. Subsequently, following this match due to call-offs, Michael Devlin and Gary Mackay-Steven were called up for the friendly with Portugal.

Aberdeen reached the League Cup Final thanks to a late header from Lewis Ferguson against Rangers with manager McInnes claiming "he was born to play at Hampden."

November 

On 6 November, Michael Devlin, Gary Mackay-Steven, Scott McKenna & Graeme Shinnie were all called up to the national team for the Nations League matches in Albania and at home to Israel. However Devlin was injured in training before the Albania match and subsequently missed the League Cup Final.

On 13 November, striker James Wilson was awarded Goal of the Month for October for his stunning strike against Hamilton Academical.

December 

On 2 December, former Dons loanee Ryan Christie scored the only goal in a 1–0 win in the League Cup Final against the Dons. During the match, winger Gary Mackay-Steven suffered concussion in a challenge with Dedryck Boyata. He was down for 6 minutes and was taken to hospital then later released. Manager McInnes later said after the match, that he "intends to come back to another final with Aberdeen and I intend to win another trophy", with his only success with the club coming in the 2014 Final.

On 5 December, the Dons won against Rangers at Ibrox with Scott McKenna scoring the only goal and having to play for almost 60 minutes with 10 men after Sam Cosgrove was wrongfully dismissed. A few days after the match, Connor McLennan signed a new deal until 2021.

Although the Dons lost their next match to St Johnstone, after this they had back-to-back wins against newly-promoted clubs Livingston and St Mirren respectively, propelling the Dons to a season-high so far of fourth in the table. Sam Cosgrove's booking against Livingston for 'diving' was later rescinded. On 21 December, despite holding talks over an extended stay, Max Lowe returned to his parent club Derby County in January.

After the comfortable 2–0 win over Hearts, the two managers had a spat beginning with Craig Levein claiming after the match they should have had 2 penalties. McInnes responded saying they "moan about this and that" but "the best team won". Levein then claimed McInnes of "double standards" and him talking "tripe" and said he was "crying like a baby" in a phone conversation. McInnes then responded again after the 4–3 defeat to Celtic saying Levein was "irrational and childish".

The Dons completed the year with a win against Livingston, placing fourth in the table. It was also announced the club will have their winter training camp again in Dubai. Later subsequently whilst in Dubai, striker Sam Cosgrove was awarded player of the month for December and manager Derek McInnes was awarded manager of the month for December.

January 

On 7 January, Sam Cosgrove signed a contract extension until 2022. On the same day, youth defender Sam Roscoe extended his loan deal with Alloa until the end of the season. On 8 January, Greg Tansey had his contract terminated with the club and later that day signed for St Mirren. There was some confusion as to whether Dean Campbell had scored against Livingston in the away win, so the SPFL awarded Campbell with the goal, his first for the club. The Dons concluded their winter training camp in Dubai with a 2–0 friendly win against Dibba Al Hisn, with Sam Cosgrove scoring both goals.

On 17 January, Max Lowe rejoined the Dons on loan from Derby County until the end of the season. On 18 January, after being on loan last season, Greg Stewart joined on loan until the end of the season from Birmingham City. The Dons returned to action in the Scottish Cup with a lackluster 1–1 draw against bottom of League One side Stenhousemuir, however they won the replay 4–1. On 22 January, summer signing Chris Forrester had his contract terminated by the club, sighting personal reasons. He returned to Ireland, his native homeland, to play for St Patrick's Athletic.

On transfer deadline day, Scott Wright joined Dundee, Bruce Anderson joined Dunfermline Athletic, and Mark Reynolds joined Dundee United all on loan respectively, until the end of the season. The Dons also rejected bids for defender Scott McKenna and winger Gary Mackay-Steven.

February 

The Dons moved up to third in the table with a hard-fought 2–1 win at Easter Road against Hibernian, even with striker Sam Cosgrove and goalkeeper Joe Lewis going off with injuries. Both players, however, were fit to play in the next match in what was a pulsating 4–2 home defeat to Rangers, with Alfredo Morelos (who was later given a 3 match ban after an appeal) and Scott McKenna clashing with both men being sent off. It was the third time Morelos had been sent off against Aberdeen this season. Rangers goalkeeper Allan McGregor was also given a possible 2 match ban for 'kicking' Lewis Ferguson. McGregor was then given the 2 match ban.

Even after a stunning goal from Stephen Dobbie, Aberdeen seen off Queen of the South with a 4–1 win in the Scottish Cup at Pittodrie. They were drawn at home in the next round against the winner of either Kilmarnock or Rangers with the latter winning in the replay. In the next league match, the Dons drew 2–2 at home to St Mirren. During the match whilst broadcasting for BBC Scotland, Derek Ferguson (father of Lewis Ferguson) announced his son was set to sign a new deal with the club. He signed on until 2024. Defender Tommie Hoban was injured in the match and a few days later, he was ruled out until the end of the season through another knee injury. He returned to Watford for treatment.

Shortly after the 2–0 win away to St Johnstone, manager Derek McInnes announced that Shay Logan would be out with an ankle injury for up to three months. The club later that day announced the signing of experienced defender Greg Halford until the end of the season. Aberdeen ended the month with a home defeat to Hamilton Academical.

March 

On 1 March, Aberdeen FC's plans for the new £50m stadium were given the legal go-ahead. The Dons Scottish Cup Quarter-final match with Rangers ended in a 1–1 draw but the match was marred with violence as 6 arrests were made and seats broken in the away section. The replay took place on 12 March. The Dons had a league match in between the Rangers matches, a 0–0 draw at Celtic Park. It was the first 0–0 between the sides since 1994.

On 12 March, Scott McKenna & Graeme Shinnie were called up to the national team. Niall McGinn was called up for Northern Ireland. On the same day, the Dons won their Scottish Cup replay with Rangers 2–0 at Ibrox.  They will play Celtic on 14 April in the Semi-final at Hampden Park with a 2:00pm kick off. Graeme Shinnie will be suspended for the match after picking up 2 yellows in the matches against Rangers. 
The Dons League home woes continued after they were held to a 1–1 draw with Livingston. The Dons ended March with their unbeaten away run coming to an end against Hearts at Tynecastle Stadium. Tom Crotty who has invested in the club became a director.

April 

Aberdeen began April by winning their first home League match of 2019 with a 3–1 win against Motherwell. The club announced that defender Mark Reynolds had agreed to join Dundee United permanently, having initially joined them on loan in January.

The Dons ended the pre-split fixtures with a 2–0 win against Dundee at Dens Park, with Sam Cosgrove scoring both goals taking his season tally up to 20. The post-split fixtures were announced with the Dons away to Kilmarnock and Rangers, then home matches against Celtic and Hearts, and finishing the season at Easter Road against Hibernian.

Scott McKenna was named captain for the Scottish Cup semi-final match against Celtic as normal captain Graeme Shinnie was suspended. Shinnie, out of contract at the end of the season, was in talks with Derby County. Aberdeen lost the match 3–0 exiting the competition, finishing the match with 9 men and with both manager and assistant being sent to the stands. Dominic Ball was given a second yellow after a head challenge with Ryan Christie which left the former with a black-eye and multiple cheek fractures. Lewis Ferguson was given a straight red for a tackle on Tom Rogic. Assistant head coach Tony Docherty was sent to the stand at half time and during the second half, manager Derek McInnes was also sent to the stand for appearing to hurl abuse at the Celtic fans, after they had allegedly sung a sectarian song about him. Police Scotland looked into the incident but found no clear evidence and both were later charged by the SFA. After the match, it was revealed Niall McGinn was out until the end of the season with an ankle injury.

Their next league match seen them win at Kilmarnock, with the home side having three players sent off, although one was later rescinded. Steve Clarke ranted at referee Steven McLean saying that "he should never referee Killie games again." He was later charged for his comments.

On 26 April before the Dons next match against Rangers their manager Steven Gerrard claimed Aberdeen only raise their games against them, with McInnes dismissing these comments. Defender Andrew Considine also signed a two-year contract extension with the option of a further year. Aberdeen lost the match 2–0 with Rangers scoring two penalties, one of which Considine was sent off for conceding.

May 

On 4 May, Aberdeen lost 3–0 at home to Celtic, handing their opponents an eighth league title in a row. Captain Graeme Shinnie announced he signed a 3 year deal on a pre-contract for Derby County. He was also named in the Premier League Team of the Year, whilst Lewis Ferguson was nominated for Young Player of the Year. On 10 May, the Dons won their final home game of the season with a 2–1 win against Hearts. A few days after the match, back-up Goalkeeper Tomáš Černý signed a new one-year deal.

On 16 May, the Aberdeen player awards took place. Ethan Ross was named Development Player of the Year, Lewis Ferguson was named Young Player of the Year and scored the Goal of the Season, Max Lowe was named Players’ Player of the Year, and Joe Lewis was named AFC Player of the Year. The next day, Ethan Ross signed a new two-year contract.

On the final day of the League season, the Dons came from behind to win 2–1 at Easter Road against Hibernian, however because Kilmarnock beat Rangers by the same scoreline, they finished the season in Fourth place. Aberdeen received the final European place after Celtic won the Scottish Cup Final against Hearts. In the close season, Frank Ross signed a new one-year deal with the option of a further year.

Results and fixtures

Pre-season

Scottish Premiership

UEFA Europa League

Qualifying phase

Scottish League Cup

Scottish Cup

Scottish Challenge Cup

Squad statistics

Appearances 

|-
|colspan="17"|Players who left the club during the season
|-

|}

Goalscorers 
As of 19 May 2019

Disciplinary record 
As of 19 May 2019

Team statistics

League table

Results by round

Transfers

Players in

Players out

Loans in

Loans out

See also 
 List of Aberdeen F.C. seasons

Footnotes

References 

2018-19
Scottish football clubs 2018–19 season
2018–19 UEFA Europa League participants seasons